Sugar Loaf Township is one of twenty current townships in Boone County, Arkansas, USA. As of the 2010 census, its total population was 2,320.

Geography

Cities, towns, and villages
Cedar Crest Estates including:
Bull Shoals Acres
Lakeshore Acres
Landings North Subdivision
Diamond City
Lead Hill
South Lead Hill

Population history
The township was located in Carroll County for the 1850 and 1860 censuses. Population includes the incorporated city of Diamond City and the incorporated towns of Lead Hill and South Lead Hill.

References
 United States Census Bureau 2008 TIGER/Line Shapefiles
 United States Board on Geographic Names (GNIS)
 United States National Atlas

 Census 2010 U.S. Gazetteer Files: County Subdivisions in Arkansas

External links
 US-Counties.com
 City-Data.com

Townships in Boone County, Arkansas
Townships in Arkansas